KPXM-TV (channel 41) is a television station licensed to St. Cloud, Minnesota, United States, broadcasting the Ion Television network to the Minneapolis–Saint Paul area. The station is owned and operated by the Ion Media subsidiary of the E. W. Scripps Company, and maintains a sales office on 176th Street NW near Big Lake; its transmitter is located near Nowthen, Minnesota.

KPXM-TV also serves the Mankato market (via K20LP-D in nearby St. James through the local municipal-operated Cooperative TV [CTV] network of translators), as that area does not have an Ion station of its own.

History
The station originally signed on the air in 1982 as KXLI ("XLI" is 41 in Roman numerals). The station branded as K-41 and showed syndicated fare and cartoons. KXLI was also simulcast on KXLT-TV channel 47 in Rochester, and by the late 1980s, Minnesota North Stars hockey broadcasts would also air on the stations.

KXLI and KXLT were owned by Halcomm Inc. with its majority stockholder and president Dale W. Lang, chairman of magazine publisher Lang Communications Inc. Lang attempted with partners to create the "Minnesota Independent Network" (MIN) with 11 stations but never got past planning and initial work.

Lang also made a $9.6 million loan to Halcomm. The stations closed down in December 1988 with Lang calling the loan in 1989 taking possession of the stations.

In 1989, Lang became the primary investor in a new television network based in Orlando, Florida, the Star Television Network. KXLT returned on September 29, 1990 again simulcasting KXLI programming as an owned and operated Star station. Both stations were broadcasting 22 hours a day with 10 hours from Star, which consisted of at least four hours of infomercials and eight hours of classic shows under the TV Heaven banner.

Following Star's closure in January 1991, KXLI/KXLT replaced its schedule with religious and infomercial programming, as well as programming from the Home Shopping Network, which continued through their purchase by Lowell "Bud" Paxson in the mid-1990s. Saturday afternoons during this time consisted of local and national hunting programs. Programming originated from the transmitter building during this time in Big Lake.

Once it was decided to bring back the moniker of TV Heaven, money was spent on a new building near the tower. TV Heaven was brought back with programs from the 1950s, '60s, '70s, '80s and some new shows during the '90s. It also had agreements to air programming from an upstart conservative network NET (National Empowerment Television) run by Paul Weyrich. To that end, the stations nicknamed themselves the Political News Network. Late evenings were taken up by many different shopping networks.

In 1998, Paxson broke the KXLI/KXLT simulcast by selling KXLT to Shockley Communications, who converted that station into a full-powered Fox affiliate for the Rochester–Austin–Mason City market; that station would replace two Minneapolis-based stations, WFTC and KMSP-TV, on cable and satellite providers in the Rochester market. Paxson also changed KXLI's call letters to KPXM, and the station would join the Pax TV network (later i: Independent Television and now Ion Television) later in 1998. The station also got a significant technical overhaul, replacing the 1970s-vintage La Kart tape switching equipment. It also moved to a new, much more powerful tower in Big Lake. The new tower more than doubled the station's coverage area, which was now comparable to those of the major Twin Cities stations.

KPXM originally had a marketing agreement with KARE (channel 11) in which KPXM repeated KARE's evening newscasts tape-delayed by half an hour, and also repeated KARE's morning show again in the afternoon. Similar arrangements were in place between other Pax and NBC stations across the country. This agreement ended in June 2005, when Paxson chose to end such agreements for all its stations.

In 2009 and 2012, the FCC authorized the station to move to a tower closer to the Twin Cities tower farm in Shoreview. However, that facility was never built.

During late May 2018, the station simulcast on RF channel 16 from the Anoka tower shared with radio station KQQL, encouraging viewers to re-scan their TVs. This change only affected those who use an antenna to receive KPXM. The station permanently moved to channel 16 on June 1, 2018 as part of the digital television repack. While both channels were still on the air, viewers saw two identical sets of channels. This move forced K16HY-D off the air in the Twin Cities, as that station broadcast from the IDS Center in downtown Minneapolis, and the two stations would interfere with each other. After the repack is complete, T-Mobile will own the spectrum vacated by the station.

Technical information

Subchannels 
The station's digital signal is multiplexed:

Analog-to-digital conversion
KPXM-TV shut down its analog signal, over UHF channel 41, on June 12, 2009, the official date in which full-power television stations in the United States transitioned from analog to digital broadcasts under federal mandate. The station's digital signal remained on its pre-transition UHF channel 40. Through the use of PSIP, digital television receivers display the station's virtual channel as its former UHF analog channel 41.

On June 1, 2018, the station signed off its transmitter on channel 40, relocating to 16 permanently after moving towers.

Translator stations
The broadcast signal of KPXM is extended by way of five digital translators in central and southern Minnesota.

References

External links 

 RabbitEars.info website

Ion Television affiliates
Bounce TV affiliates
Grit (TV network) affiliates
Ion Mystery affiliates
Laff (TV network) affiliates
Defy TV affiliates
Scripps News affiliates
E. W. Scripps Company television stations
Television channels and stations established in 1982
Television stations in Minneapolis–Saint Paul
St. Cloud, Minnesota
1982 establishments in Minnesota
National Hockey League over-the-air television broadcasters